Events from the year 1939 in Canada.

Incumbents

Crown 
 Monarch – George VI

Federal government 
 Governor General – John Buchan
 Prime Minister – William Lyon Mackenzie King
 Chief Justice – Lyman Poore Duff (British Columbia)
 Parliament – 18th

Provincial governments

Lieutenant governors 
Lieutenant Governor of Alberta – John C. Bowen   
Lieutenant Governor of British Columbia – Eric Hamber
Lieutenant Governor of Manitoba – William Johnston Tupper  
Lieutenant Governor of New Brunswick – Murray MacLaren  
Lieutenant Governor of Nova Scotia – Robert Irwin 
Lieutenant Governor of Ontario – Albert Edward Matthews 
Lieutenant Governor of Prince Edward Island – George DesBrisay DeBlois (until September 11) then Bradford William LePage 
Lieutenant Governor of Quebec – Esioff-Léon Patenaude (until December 30) then  Eugène Fiset 
Lieutenant Governor of Saskatchewan – Archibald Peter McNab

Premiers 
Premier of Alberta – William Aberhart    
Premier of British Columbia – Thomas Dufferin Pattullo 
Premier of Manitoba – John Bracken 
Premier of New Brunswick – Allison Dysart 
Premier of Nova Scotia – Angus Lewis Macdonald
Premier of Ontario – Mitchell Hepburn 
Premier of Prince Edward Island – Thane Campbell  
Premier of Quebec – Maurice Duplessis (until November 9) then Adélard Godbout 
Premier of Saskatchewan – William John Patterson

Territorial governments

Commissioners 
 Controller of Yukon – George A. Jeckell 
 Commissioner of Northwest Territories – Charles Camsell

Events
May 17 – King George VI and Queen Elizabeth begin their royal tour of Canada, eventually visiting every province and Newfoundland.
September 3 – The Department of Labour establishes the Wartime Prices and Trade Board to control inflation
September 7 – Prime Minister Mackenzie King calls for a special session of Parliament, to discuss a declaration of war versus Nazi Germany. The session lasts until September 13.
September 10 – World War II: Canada declares war on Germany, one week after the United Kingdom does so
September 11 – World War II: Canada establishes a High Commission of Canada in Australia. Australia reciprocates the next day.
September 16 – World War II: The Royal Canadian Navy escorts the first of many transatlantic convoys
September 28 – World War II: Air training facilities are set up in Canada to train pilots from Britain and the rest of the Commonwealth.
October 25 – The Quebec election is won by the Liberals under Joseph-Adélard Godbout.
December 17 – World War II: The 1st Canadian Infantry Division lands in Scotland en route to England. The division is accompanied by a team of announcers and technicians, who set up Radio Canada's overseas service.
November 9 – Adélard Godbout becomes premier of Quebec for the second time, replacing Maurice Duplessis

Year-long
Canada expands its international presence by establishing High Commissions in Australia, Ireland, New Zealand and South Africa.

Sport 
February 12 – The Trail Smoke Eaters win the 1939 Ice Hockey World Championships for Canada.
April 16 – The Boston Bruins win their second Stanley Cup (and last until 1970) by defeating the Toronto Maple Leafs 4 games to 1.
April 17 – The Ontario Hockey Association's Oshawa Generals win their first Memorial Cup by defeating the Edmonton Junior Hockey League's Edmonton Athletic Club Roamers 3 games to 1. The deciding Game 4 was played at Maple Leaf Gardens in Toronto.
December 9 – The Winnipeg Blue Bombers win their second Grey Cup by defeating the Ottawa Rough Riders 8 to 7 in the 27th Grey Cup played in Lansdowne Park in Ottawa.

Births

January to March
January 3 - Bobby Hull, ice hockey player
January 11 - Anne Heggtveit, alpine skier and Olympic gold medalist

January 14 - Martha Gibson, actress
January 19 - Grant Notley, politician (d. 1984)
February 3 - Ovid Jackson, politician
February 10 - Adrienne Clarkson, journalist and 26th Governor General of Canada
March 1 - Marlene Catterall, politician
March 5 - Peter Woodcock, serial killer and child rapist (d. 2010)
March 8 - Lynn Seymour, ballerina (d. 2023)
March 17 - Bill Graham, politician (d. 2022)
March 20 - Brian Mulroney, politician and 18th Prime Minister of Canada
March 26 - Patrick Lane, poet  (d. 2019)

April to June

April 14 - Ian Binnie, jurist and puisne justice on the Supreme Court of Canada
April 20 - Wayson Choy, writer (d. 2019)
April 24 - Dan Hays, politician
April 24 - Ernst Zündel, German-born neo-Nazi, Holocaust denier and pamphleteer (d. 2017)
May 7 - Sidney Altman, molecular biologist, joint 1989 Nobel Prize in Chemistry laureate (d. 2022)
May 11 - Ken Epp, politician (d. 2022)
May 16 - Roger Soloman, politician (d. 2021)
May 26 - Gerry McAlpine, politician
June 5 - Joe Clark, journalist, politician, statesman, businessman, professor and 16th Prime Minister of Canada
June 23 - Jack MacIsaac, politician

July to September
July 12 - David Bazay, television journalist (d. 2005)
July 19 - Ray Turnbull, curler (d. 2017)
July 25 - Catherine Callbeck, politician and 30th Premier of Prince Edward Island
August 12 - Roy Romanow, politician and 12th Premier of Saskatchewan
August 15 - Hardial Bains, founder and leader of Communist Party of Canada (Marxist-Leninist) (d. 1997)
August 21 - JoAnn Wilson, murder victim (d. 1983)
August 23 - Isabel Bassett, broadcaster and politician
August 31 - Dennis Lee, poet and children's writer
September 1 - Jake Epp, politician
September 2 - Henry Mintzberg, academic and author on business and management
September 4 - Jim Penner, businessman and politician (d. 2004)
September 10 – Jim Pappin, ice hockey player (d. 2022)
September 11 – Lyse Richer, administrator and music teacher
September 30 - Len Cariou, actor

October to December
October 5 - Marie-Claire Blais, novelist, poet and playwright (d. 2021)
November 6 - Joyce Fairbairn, Senator and first woman to serve as Leader of the Government in the Senate (d. 2022)
November 18 - Margaret Atwood, author, poet, critic, feminist and social campaigner
November 23 - Bill Bissett, poet
November 30 - Louis LeBel, jurist and puisne justice on the Supreme Court of Canada
December 2 - Francis Fox, politician, minister and senator
December 21 - Lloyd Axworthy, politician and minister
December 24 - James Bartleman, diplomat, author and 27th Lieutenant Governor of Ontario

Full date unknown
Michael Estok, poet (d. 1989)
Michael Overs, businessman, founder and owner of Pizza Pizza Limited (d. 2010)
Tony Parsons, journalist and television news anchor
Robin Spry, filmmaker and television producer (d. 2005)

Deaths
January 24 - Alfred Edmond Bourgeois, politician (b. 1872)
March 7 - Sir Joseph Flavelle, businessman (b. 1858)
March 8 - Henry Pellatt, financier and soldier (b. 1859)
May 6 - Edward S. Rogers, Sr., inventor and radio pioneer (b. 1900)
July 12 - Fernand Rinfret, politician (b. 1883)
August 21 - Francis Patrick O'Connor, businessman, politician and philanthropist (b. 1885)
November 12 - Norman Bethune, physician and medical innovator (b. 1890)
November 28 - James Naismith, sports coach and innovator, inventor of basketball (b. 1861)
December 22 - Herbert James Palmer, politician and Premier of Prince Edward Island (b. 1851)
December 27 – Napoléon Turcot, politician (b. 1867)

Full date unknown
Constance Piers, journalist, poet and editor (b. 1866)

See also
 List of Canadian films

Historical documents
With crisis in Europe, MP suggests Canada follow up on Statute of Westminster by declaring neutrality and following America-oriented defence policy

Labour Day finds fighters and nurses enlisting for overseas service and Red Cross rushing its wartime planning

Editorial says Canada and Commonwealth are "one and indivisible, [and] pledged unwaveringly to the support of the Mother Country"

Before declaring war, PM King asks Commons for "authority for effective cooperation by Canada at the side of Britain"

MP J.S. Woodsworth interrogates "cooperation," unspoken government policy, and whether Canada is already in war

"We cannot be at peace while the head of this Empire is at war" - Sen. Arthur Meighen insists Canada enter European conflict

Canada's declaration of war against German Reich

Editorial says PM King, in choosing home defence over expeditionary force, is not giving "definite leadership"

Regimen for Princess Patricia's Canadian Light Infantry's transport ship includes lectures, training and organized games

Enlisted man's 1939 surprises: Poland's fall weeks after invasion, and Christmas invitation given on his first day in England

Editorial says "equality of sacrifice," essential to war effort, must include fairness in agricultural costs, prices and margins

British meals depend on Canada for breakfast porridge and (with other wheat exporters) bread, and cheese, tinned soup, and suet in pudding at tea

MP A.A. Heaps advocates joining other countries in welcoming refugees from persecution

Mentioning uranium ore in Canada and German-occupied Czechoslovakia, Einstein urges President Roosevelt to back atomic energy research

"Only a mile from home" - Eleven-year-old student Andrew Gordon from Gordon's reserve residential school dies of exposure walking home

Supreme Court finds tavern, in absence of specific law, has "freedom of commerce" to not serve Black man

Law professor comments on Quebec's Padlock Law allowing police to seal premises and arrest occupants deemed "communistic"

Private intelligence agency offers to spy on corporation's workers to detect "plots, plans and unrest"

Mao's appreciation of Norman Bethune - "We must all learn the spirit of absolute selflessness from him"

Poster: "Time Is Life" depicts Bethune riding a galloping horse

King George VI - "It is my earnest hope that my present visit may give my Canadian people a deeper conception of their unity as a nation."

Woman records her excitement over 1939 royal tour of George VI and Elizabeth in her diary

Film of royal tour's stops in Calgary, Banff, Vancouver and Victoria

CBC chairman tells House committee move into television will not come soon because of its current technical and financial limitations

Course in interior decoration includes hands-on stitching, glazing, block-printing, weaving, lettering, etc., etc.

Photo: children work on their art projects in Arthur Lismer's children's art classes in Toronto

Calling "more friendly relations" essential to world progress, bank's advertisement pledges friendship in its service

References

 
Years of the 20th century in Canada
Canada
1939 in North America